The 2012–13 Denver Nuggets season was the 46th season of the franchise, and its 37th season in the National Basketball Association (NBA). They finished the regular season with 57 wins and 25 losses, the franchise's best record since joining the NBA in 1977. The Nuggets, however, were unable to defeat the 6th seeded Golden State Warriors in a six-game first round series.

The team was able to acquire Andre Iguodala in the off-season. It was his only season in a Nuggets uniform before being sent to the Warriors at the end of the season.

Following the season, George Karl was fired as Nuggets head coach despite winning Coach of the Year.

The Nuggets would not make the playoffs again until 2019.

Key dates
 June 28: The 2012 NBA draft took place at Prudential Center in Newark, New Jersey.
 November 25: Before their 102–84 win over the New Orleans Hornets, the team honored the participants of the 2012 Olympics who live in the Denver area.*January 3: Andre Miller reached 15,000 career points.
 March 19: With a 114–104 win on the road over the Oklahoma City Thunder, the Denver Nuggets set a team record for consecutive wins with 13 in a row.
 March 25: Losing on the road 86–110 to the New Orleans Hornets, the Denver Nuggets ended a team record of 15 consecutive wins in a row.
 April 10: With their 96-86 home victory over the San Antonio Spurs, the Nuggets set a team record with 21 straight home wins and tie a record of 36 overall home wins and 54 total wins.
 April 14: With a 118–109 home win over the Portland Trail Blazers, the Nuggets set a franchise record with 55 total wins.
 May 2: The Nuggets were eliminated from the 2013 NBA Playoffs by the Golden State Warriors 4–2 with an 88–92 loss on the road.

Draft

  Acquired from the Golden State Warriors.

Roster

Pre-season

|- style="background:#cfc;"
| 1
| October 6
| @ L. A. Clippers
| 
| Kenneth Faried (18)
| Kosta Koufos (8)
| Anthony Carter (8)
| Mandalay Bay Events Center6,748
| 1–0
|- style="background:#cfc;"
| 2
| October 12
| @ San Antonio
| 
| Corey Brewer (24)
| Kosta Koufos (11)
| Anthony Carter, Ty Lawson (4)
| AT&T Center17,948
| 2–0
|- style="background:#cfc;"
| 3
| October 15
| Golden State
| 
| Danilo Gallinari (18)
| Kosta Koufos (13)
| Andre Iguodala (7)
| Pepsi Center11,621
| 3–0
|- style="background:#fcc;"
| 4
| October 17
| @ Portland
| 
| Kenneth Faried (17)
| Kenneth Faried (11)
| Anthony Carter, Andre Miller (4)
| Rose Garden17,856
| 3–1
|- style="background:#fcc;"
| 5
| October 21
| @ Oklahoma City
| 
| Danilo Gallinari (26)
| Andre Iguodala (10)
| Ty Lawson (11)
| Chesapeake Energy Arena18,203
| 3–2
|- style="background:#fcc;"
| 6
| October 25
| L. A. Clippers
| 
| Corey Brewer (15)
| Kenneth Faried, Kosta Koufos (10)
| Andre Iguodala (7)
| Pepsi Center13,406
| 3–3
|- style="background:#fcc;"
| 7
| October 26
| @ Phoenix
| 
| Jordan Hamilton (15)
| Jordan Hamilton (10)
| Andre Miller (9)
| US Airways Center11,976
| 3–4

Regular season

Game log

|- bgcolor="#ffcccc"
| 1 || October 31 || @ Philadelphia
| 
| Ty Lawson (16)
| Kosta Koufos (9)
| Ty Lawson (7)
| Wells Fargo Center19,101
| 0–1
|- bgcolor=
 
|- bgcolor="#ffcccc"    
| 2 || November 2 || @ Orlando
| 
| Danilo Gallinari (23)
| Gallinari, Iguodala (8)
| Ty Lawson (7)
| Amway Center18,846
| 0–2
|- bgcolor="#ffcccc"      
| 3 || November 3 || @ Miami
| 
| Faried & Iguodala (22)
| Kenneth Faried (12)
| Ty Lawson (6)
| American Airlines Arena20,104
| 0-3
|- bgcolor="#ccffcc"      
| 4 || November 6 || Detroit
| 
| Andre Iguodala (17)
| Andre Iguodala (10)
| Ty Lawson (9)
| Pepsi Center19,155
| 1-3
|- bgcolor="#ccffcc"      
| 5 || November 7 || @ Houston
| 
| Ty Lawson (21)
| Kenneth Faried (16)
| Ty Lawson (8)
| Toyota Center13,372
| 2-3
|- bgcolor="#ccffcc"       
| 6 || November 9 || Utah
| 
| Corey Brewer (20)
| Faried & Koufos (10)
| Lawson & Miller (7)
| Pepsi Center15,523
| 3-3
|- bgcolor="#ccffcc"       
| 7 || November 10 || @ Golden State
| 
| Danilo Gallinari (21)
| Kenneth Faried (17)
| Ty Lawson (10)
| Oracle Arena19,596
| 4-3
|- bgcolor="#ffcccc"       
| 8 || November 12 || @ Phoenix
| 
| Andre Iguodala (17)
| Kenneth Faried (11)
| Ty Lawson (8)
| US Airways Center14,060
| 4-4
|- bgcolor="#ffcccc"       
| 9 || November 15 || Miami
| 
| Andre Miller (19)
| Kenneth Faried (20)
| Ty Lawson (8)
| Pepsi Center19,155
| 4-5
|- bgcolor="#ffcccc"       
| 10 || November 17 || @ San Antonio
| 
| Danilo Gallinari (15)
| Javale McGee (8)
| Ty Lawson (5)
| AT&T Center18,581
| 4-6
|- bgcolor="#ccffcc"       
| 11 || November 19 || @ Memphis
| 
| Danilo Gallinari (26)
| Kenneth Faried (13)
| Andre Miller (8)
| FedExForum15,111
| 5-6
|- bgcolor="#ccffcc"       
| 12 || November 21 || @ Minnesota
| 
| Danilo Gallinari (19)
| Kenneth Faried (14)
| Ty Lawson (9)
| Target Center16,879
| 6-6
|- bgcolor="#ccffcc"       
| 13 || November 23 || Golden State
| 
| Andre Iguodala (29)
| Kenneth Faried (11)
| Ty Lawson (9)
| Pepsi Center18,523
| 7-6
|- bgcolor="#ccffcc"      
| 14 || November 25 || New Orleans
| 
| Andre Iguodala (23)
| Kenneth Faried (12)
| Andre Miller (7)
| Pepsi Center15,402
| 8-6
|- bgcolor="#ffcccc"       
| 15 || November 26 || @ Utah
| 
| Kenneth Faried (21)
| Faried & Koufos (9)
| Ty Lawson (9)
| EnergySolutions Arena18,776
| 8-7
|- bgcolor="#ffcccc"       
| 16 || November 29 || @ Golden State
| 
| Andre Iguodala (22)
| Danilo Gallinari (9)
| Ty Lawson (9)
| Oracle Arena17,627
| 8–8
|- bgcolor="#ffcccc"       
| 17 || November 30 || @ L. A. Lakers
| 
| Danilo Gallinari (19)
| Jordan Hamilton (8)
| Ty Lawson (5)
| Staples Center18,997
| 8-9
 
|- bgcolor="#ccffcc"       
| 18 || December 3 || Toronto
| 
| Corey Brewer (19)
| Faried & Koufos (10)
| Andre Iguodala (8)
| Pepsi Center15,221
| 9-9
|- bgcolor="#ffcccc"       
| 19 || December 5 || @ Atlanta
| 
| Ty Lawson (32)
| Timofey Mozgov (13)
| Ty Lawson (7)
| Philips Arena14,101
| 9-10
|- bgcolor="#ccffcc"       
| 20 || December 7 || @ Indiana
| 
| Brewer & McGee (20)
| Javale McGee (8)
| Gallinari & Miller (8)
| Bankers Life Fieldhouse15,289
| 10-10
|- bgcolor="#ffcccc"
| 21 || December 9 || @ New York
| 
| Ty Lawson (23)
| Danilo Gallinari (9)
| Ty Lawson (6)
| Madison Square Garden19,033
| 10-11
|- bgcolor="#ccffcc"
| 22 || December 11 || @ Detroit
| 
| Ty Lawson (26)
| Andre Iguodala (8)
| Lawson & Miller (7)
| The Palace of Auburn Hills10,265
| 11-11
|- bgcolor="#ffcccc"
| 23 || December 12 || @ Minnesota
| 
| Kenneth Faried (26)
| Kenneth Faried (14)
| Ty Lawson (11)
| Target Center16,444
| 11-12
|- bgcolor="#ccffcc"       
| 24 || December 14 || Memphis
| 
| Andre Iguodala (20)
| Kenneth Faried (10)
| Andre Iguodala (7)
| Pepsi Center16,367
| 12-12
|- bgcolor="#ccffcc"
| 25 || December 16 || @ Sacramento
| 
| Javale McGee (19)
| Faried & Iguodala (8)
| Andre Iguodala (8)
| Power Balance Pavilion13,327
| 13-12
|- bgcolor="#ccffcc"       
| 26 || December 18 || San Antonio
| 
| Danilo Gallinari (28)
| Kosta Koufos (14)
| Andre Miller (7)
| Pepsi Center17,092
| 14-12
|- bgcolor="#ffcccc"       
| 27 || December 20 || @ Portland
| 
| Brewer, Iguodala,& Lawson (13)
| Brewer, Koufos,& Miller (9)
| Ty Lawson (8)
| Rose Garden19,982
| 14-13
|- bgcolor="#ccffcc"       
| 28 || December 22 || Charlotte
| 
| Kosta Koufos (16)
| Kenneth Faried (9)
| Iguodala & Miller (8)
| Pepsi Center17,555
| 15-13
|- bgcolor="#ffcccc"       
| 29 || December 25 || @ L. A. Clippers
| 
| Hamilton & Koufos (16)
| Kosta Koufos (10)
| Andre Miller (6)
| Staples Center19,346
| 15-14
|- bgcolor="#ccffcc"       
| 30 || December 26 || L. A. Lakers
| 
| Corey Brewer (27)
| Kenneth Faried (15)
| Ty Lawson (14)
| Pepsi Center19,155
| 16-14
|- bgcolor="#ccffcc"       
| 31 || December 28 || @ Dallas
| 
| Danilo Gallinari (39)
| Kenneth Faried (19)
| Andre Miller (9)
| American Airlines Center20,439
| 17-14
|- bgcolor="#ffcccc"       
| 32 || December 29 || @ Memphis
| 
| Brewer, Iguodala,& McGee (12)
| Javale McGee (9)
| Andre Iguodala (5)
| FedExForum17,707
| 17-15
 
|- bgcolor="#ccffcc"       
| 33 || January 1 || L. A. Clippers
| 
| Danilo Gallinari (17)
| Kenneth Faried (11)
| Andre Miller (12)
| Pepsi Center19,155
| 18-15
|- bgcolor="#ffcccc"
| 34 || January 3 || Minnesota
| 
| Koufos & Lawson (16)
| Iguodala & Koufos (7)
| Andre Miller (10)
| Pepsi Center16,921
| 18-16
|- bgcolor="#ccffcc"      
| 35 || January 5 || Utah
| 
| Danilo Gallinari (26)
| Kosta Koufos (13)
| Andre Miller (6)
| Pepsi Center19,155
| 19-16
|- bgcolor="#ccffcc"       
| 36 || January 6 || @ L. A. Lakers
| 
| Ty Lawson (21)
| Kosta Koufos (7)
| Lawson & Miller (10)
| Staples Center18,997
| 20-16
|- bgcolor="#ccffcc"       
| 37 || January 9 || Orlando
| 
| Faried & Lawson (19)
| Kenneth Faried (19)
| Ty Lawson (8)
| Pepsi Center15,084
| 21-16
|- bgcolor="#ccffcc"       
| 38 || January 11 || Cleveland
| 
| Danilo Gallinari (23)
| Faried & Iguodala (11)
| Ty Lawson (8)
| Pepsi Center16,445
| 22-16
|- bgcolor="#ccffcc"       
| 39 || January 13 || Golden State
| 
| Danilo Gallinari (21)
| Kenneth Faried (10)
| Andre Miller (8)
| Pepsi Center15,861
| 23-16
|- bgcolor="#ccffcc"       
| 40 || January 15 || Portland
| 
| Danilo Gallinari (25)
| Kenneth Faried (11)
| Ty Lawson (12)
| Pepsi Center15,521
| 24-16
|- bgcolor="#ffcccc"       
| 41 || January 16 || @ Oklahoma City
| 
| Kosta Koufos (16)
| Kosta Koufos (9)
| Andre Miller (10)
| Chesapeake Energy Arena18,203
| 24-17
|- bgcolor="#ffcccc"       
| 42 || January 18 || Washington
| 
| Ty Lawson (29)
| Kosta Koufos (7)
| Ty Lawson (6)
| Pepsi Center16,523
| 24-18
|- bgcolor="#ccffcc"       
| 43 || January 20 || Oklahoma City
| 
| Corey Brewer (26)
| Kosta Koufos (11)
| Ty Lawson (9)
| Pepsi Center19155
| 25-18
|- bgcolor="#ccffcc"       
| 44 || January 23 || @ Houston
| 
| Ty Lawson (21)
| Chandler, Faried, Gallinari,Iguodala & Koufos (6)
| Ty Lawson (7)
| Toyota Center16,867
| 26-18
|- bgcolor="#ccffcc"       
| 45 || January 26 || Sacramento
| 
| Ty Lawson (26)
| Kenneth Faried (9)
| Andre Miller (9)
| Pepsi Center17,651
| 27-18
|- bgcolor="#ccffcc"       
| 46 || January 28 || Indiana
| 
| Danilo Gallinari (27)
| Kosta Koufos (11)
| Lawson & Iguodala (7)
| Pepsi Center16,032
| 28-18
|- bgcolor="#ccffcc"       
| 47 || January 30 || Houston
| 
| Danilo Gallinari (27)
| Kenneth Faried (9)
| Andre Iguodala (6)
| Pepsi Center17,399
| 29-18

|- bgcolor="#ccffcc"
| 48 || February 1 || New Orleans
| 
| Andre Iguodala (24)
| Kenneth Faried (9)
| Ty Lawson (13)
| Pepsi Center17,221
| 30-18
|- bgcolor="#ccffcc"
| 49 || February 5 || Milwaukee
| 
| Gallinari & Lawson (22)
| Chandler & Faried (10)
| Andre Miller (9)
| Pepsi Center15,272
| 31-18
|- bgcolor="#ccffcc"
| 50 || February 7 || Chicago
| 
| Wilson Chandler (24)
| Kenneth Faried (12)
| Ty Lawson (12)
| Pepsi Center19,325
| 32-18
|- bgcolor="#ccffcc"
| 51 || February 9 || @ Cleveland
| 
| Danilo Gallinari (19)
| Gallinari & Koufos (9)
| Andre Iguodala (7)
| Quicken Loans Arena20,562
| 33-18
|- bgcolor="#ffcccc"
| 52 || February 10 || @ Boston
| 
| Ty Lawson (29)
| Kenneth Faried (12)
| Ty Lawson (9)
| TD Garden18,624
| 33-19
|- bgcolor="#ffcccc"
| 53 || February 12 || @ Toronto
| 
| Ty Lawson (29)
| Kenneth Faried (11)
| Ty Lawson (9)
| Air Canada Centre16,738
| 33-20
|- bgcolor="#ffcccc"
| 54 || February 13 || @ Brooklyn
| 
| Ty Lawson (26)
| Chandler & Koufos (7)
| Andre Miller (10)
| Barclays Center17,251
| 33-21
|- align="center"
|colspan="9" bgcolor="#bbcaff"|All-Star Break
|- bgcolor="#ccffcc"
| 55 || February 19 || Boston
| 
| Gallinari & Lawson (26)
| Kenneth Faried (16)
| Andre Iguodala (7)
| Pepsi Center19,155
| 34-21
|- bgcolor="#ffcccc"
| 56 || February 22 || @ Washington
| 
| Ty Lawson (27)
| Kosta Koufos (7)
| Ty Lawson (12)
| Verizon Center16,527
| 34-22
|- bgcolor="#ccffcc"
| 57 || February 23 || @ Charlotte
| 
| Ty Lawson (20)
| Kosta Koufos (6)
| Andre Iguodala (10)
| Time Warner Cable Arena18,481
| 35-22
|- bgcolor="#ccffcc"
| 58 || February 25 || L. A. Lakers
| 
| Wilson Chandler (23)
| Kenneth Faried (10)
| Andre Iguodala (12)
| Pepsi Center19,155
| 36-22
|- bgcolor="#ccffcc"
| 59 || February 27 || @ Portland
| 
| Ty Lawson (30)
| Kenneth Faried (8)
| Andre Miller (10)
| Rose Garden20,077
| 37-22

|- bgcolor="#ccffcc"
| 60 || March 1 || Oklahoma City
| 
| Wilson Chandler (35)
| Kosta Koufos (13)
| Lawson and Miller (7)
| Pepsi Center19,521
| 38-22
|- bgcolor="#ccffcc"
| 61 || March 4 || Atlanta
| 
| Corey Brewer (22)
| Kenneth Faried (13)
| Andre Miller (9)
| Pepsi Center17,554
| 39-22
|- bgcolor="#ccffcc"
| 62 || March 5 || @ Sacramento
| 
| Ty Lawson (24)
| Kenneth Faried (12)
| Andre Iguodala (7)
| Power Balance Pavilion11,923
| 40-22
|- bgcolor="#ccffcc"
| 63 || March 7 || L. A. Clippers
| 
| Ty Lawson (21)
| Kenneth Faried (10)
| Ty Lawson (11)
| Pepsi Center18,857
| 41-22
|- bgcolor="#ccffcc"
| 64 || March 9 || Minnesota
| 
| Ty Lawson (32)
| Kenneth Faried (11)
| Danilo Gallinari (6)
| Pepsi Center18,823
| 42-22
|- bgcolor="#ccffcc"
| 65 || March 11 || @ Phoenix
| 
| Kosta Koufos (22)
| Kosta Koufos (10)
| Andre Iguodala (7)
| US Airways Center15,597
| 43-22
|- bgcolor="#ccffcc"
| 66 || March 13 || New York
| 
| Wilson Chandler (24)
| Kenneth Faried (10)
| Ty Lawson (7)
| Pepsi Center19,155
| 44-22
|- bgcolor="#ccffcc"
| 67 || March 15 || Memphis
| 
| Kosta Koufos (18)
| Kosta Koufos (16)
| Andre Iguodala (7)
| Pepsi Center19,408
| 45-22
|- bgcolor="#ccffcc"
| 68 || March 18 || @ Chicago
| 
| Wilson Chandler (35)
| Andre Iguodala (10)
| Wilson Chandler (4)
| United Center 22,138
| 46-22
|- bgcolor="#ccffcc"
| 69 || March 19 || @ Oklahoma City
| 
| Ty Lawson (25)
| Kenneth Faried (15)
| Andre Miller (9)
| Chesapeake Energy Arena18,203
| 47-22
|- bgcolor="#ccffcc"
| 70 || March 21 || Philadelphia
| 
| Corey Brewer (29)
| Kosta Koufos (8)
| Andre Miller (8)
| Pepsi Center19,155
| 48-22
|- bgcolor="#ccffcc"
| 71 || March 23 || Sacramento
| 
| Danilo Gallinari (19)
| Kenneth Faried (9)
| Andre Iguodala (8)
| Pepsi Center19,155
| 49-22
|- bgcolor="#ffcccc"
| 72 || March 25 || @ New Orleans
| 
| Danilo Gallinari (24)
| Kenneth Faried (7)
| Andre Miller (6)
| New Orleans Arena11,185
| 49-23
|- bgcolor="#ffcccc"
| 73 || March 27 || @ San Antonio
| 
| Javale McGee (21)
| Javale McGee (11)
| Andre Miller (8)
| AT&T Center18,581
| 49-24
|- bgcolor="#ccffcc"
| 74 || March 29 || Brooklyn
| 
| Evan Fournier (19)
| Kosta Koufos (9)
| Andre Iguodala (8)
| Pepsi Center19,155
| 50-24

|- bgcolor="#ccffcc"
| 75 || April 3 || @ Utah
| 
| Danilo Gallinari (21)
| Kosta Koufos (13)
| Andre Iguodala (6)
| EnergySolutions Arena17,654
| 51-24
|- bgcolor="#ccffcc"
| 76 || April 4 || Dallas
| 
| Corey Brewer (23)
| Kenneth Faried (19)
| Andre Iguodala (8)
| Pepsi Center19,155
| 52-24
|- bgcolor="#ccffcc"
| 77 || April 6 || Houston
| 
| Corey Brewer (22)
| Koufos & Iguodala & Randolph (7)
| Andre Iguodala (14)
| Pepsi Center19,155
| 53-24
|- bgcolor="#ccffcc"
| 78 || April 10 || San Antonio
| 
| Wilson Chandler (29)
| Andre Iguodala (13)
| Andre Iguodala (10)
| Pepsi Center16,651
| 54-24
|- bgcolor="#ffcccc"
| 79 || April 12 || @ Dallas
| 
| Chandler, Iguodala & Brewer (18)
| Kenneth Faried (10)
| Andre Miller (8)
| American Airlines Center20,368
| 54-25
|- bgcolor="#ccffcc"
| 80 || April 14 || Portland
| 
| Andre Iguodala (28)
| Andre Iguodala (7)
| Ty Lawson (10)
| Pepsi Center19,155
| 55-25
|- bgcolor="#ccffcc"
| 81 || April 15 || @ Milwaukee
| 
| Ty Lawson (26)
| Javale McGee (17)
| Lawson & Iguodala (7)
| BMO Harris Bradley Center16,517
| 56-25
|- bgcolor="#ccffcc"
| 82 || April 17 || Phoenix
| 
| Wilson Chandler (21)
| Anthony Randolph (14)
| Ty Lawson (7)
| Pepsi Center17,539
| 57-25

Standings

Playoffs

|- style="background:#cfc;"
| 1
| April 20
| Golden State
| 
| Andre Miller (28)
| Wilson Chandler (13)
| Andre Iguodala (8)
| Pepsi Center19,155
| 1-0
|- style="background:#fcc;"
| 2
| April 23
| Golden State
| 
| Corey BrewerTy Lawson (19)
| Wilson Chandler (6)
| Ty Lawson (12)
| Pepsi Center19,155
| 1-1
|- style="background:#fcc;"
| 3
| April 26
| @ Golden State
| 
| Ty Lawson (35)
| Wilson Chandler (9)
| Ty Lawson (10)
| Oracle Arena19,596
| 1-2
|- style="background:#fcc;"
| 4
| April 28
| @ Golden State
| 
| Ty Lawson (26)
| Kenneth Faried (12)
| Ty Lawson (6)
| Oracle Arena19,596
| 1-3
|- style="background:#cfc;"
| 5
| April 30
| Golden State
| 
| Andre Iguodala (25)
| Andre Iguodala (12)
| Ty Lawson (10)
| Pepsi Center19,155
| 2-3
|- style="background:#fcc;"
| 6
| May 2
| @ Golden State
| 
| Andre Iguodala (24)
| Kenneth Faried (11)
| Andre IguodalaTy Lawson (6)
| Oracle Arena
| 2-4

Player statistics

Regular season

|- align="center" bgcolor=""
| 
|style=|82 || 2 || 24.4 || .425 || .296 || .690 || 2.9 || 1.5 || 1.44 || .28 || 12.1
|- align="center" bgcolor=""
| 
| 43 || 8 || 25.1 || .462 || .413 || .793 || 5.1 || 1.3 || 1.05 || .28 || 13.0
|- align="center" bgcolor=""
| 
| 80 || 80 || 28.1 || .552 || .000 || .613 ||style=|9.2 || 1.0 || 1.01 || 1.04 || 11.5
|- align="center" bgcolor=""
| 
| 38 || 4 || 11.3 || .493 || .407 || .769 || .9 || 1.2 || .5 || .03 || 5.3
|- align="center" bgcolor=""
| 
| 71 || 71 || 32.5 || .418 || .373 || .822 || 5.2 || 2.5 || .9 || .51 || 16.2
|- align="center" bgcolor=""
| 
| 40 || 1 || 9.9 || .418 || .370 || .500 || 2.4 || .6 || .38 || .2 || 5.2
|- align="center" bgcolor=""
| 
| 80 || 80 ||style=|34.7 || .451 || .317 || .574 || 5.3 || 5.4 ||style=|1.74 || .65 || 13.0
|- align="center" bgcolor=""
| 
| 81 ||style=|81 || 22.4 || .581 || .000 || .558 || 6.9 || .4 || .54 || 1.27 || 8.0
|- align="center" bgcolor=""
| 
| 73 || 71 || 34.4 || .461 || .366 || .756 || 2.7 ||style=|6.9 || 1.47 || .11 ||style=|16.7
|- align="center" bgcolor=""
| 
| 79 || 0 || 18.1 || .575 ||style=|1.000 || .591 || 4.8 || .3 || .38 ||style=|1.99 || 9.1
|- align="center" bgcolor=""
| 
|style=|82 || 11 || 26.2 || .479 || .266 || style=|.840 || 2.9 || 5.9 || .89 || .13 || 9.6
|- align="center" bgcolor=""
| 
| 7 || 0 || 3.7 || .333 || .000 || .500 || .3 || .4 || .14 || .00 || 1.3
|- align="center" bgcolor=""
| 
| 41 || 1 || 8.9 || .506 || .000 || .769 || 2.6 || .2 || .15 || .44 || 2.6
|- align="center" bgcolor=""
| 
| 39 || 0 || 8.4 || .491 || .000 || .689 || 2.4 || .3 || .49 || .54 || 3.7
|- align="center" bgcolor=""
| 
| 4 || 0 || 7.0 ||style=|1.000 || .000 || .750 || .8 || .5 || .25 || .00 || 1.8
|}

 Statistics with the Denver Nuggets.

Playoffs

|- align="center" bgcolor=""
| 
|style=|6 || 0 || 24.3 || .309 || .250 || .670 || 1.8 || 1.2 || 1.00 || .17 || 10.8
|- align="center" bgcolor=""
| 
|style=|6 || style=|6 || 34.2 || .355 || .310 || .750 || 5.5 || 1.3 || 1.33 || .50 || 12.0
|- align="center" bgcolor=""
| 
| 5 || 4 || 29.0 || .625 || .000 || .730 ||style=|8.4 || 0.2 || 1.00 || .20 || 10.2
|- align="center" bgcolor=""
| 
| 4 || 4 || 13.3 || .353 || .000 || .880 || .00 || 1.0 || .5 || .00 || 4.8
|- align="center" bgcolor=""
| 
| 1 || 0 || 2.0 || .000 || .000 || .000 || .00 || .00 || .00 || .00 || 0.0
|- align="center" bgcolor=""
| 
|style=|6 || style=|6 ||style=|40.5 || .500 || .483 || .720 || 8.0 || 5.3 ||style=|2.00 || .33 || 18.0
|- align="center" bgcolor=""
| 
|style=|6 || 2 || 16.7 || .368 || style=|1.000 || .830 || 3.5 || .5 || .50 || .67 || 3.3
|- align="center" bgcolor=""
| 
|style=|6 || style=|6 || 39.3 || .440 || .190 || .850 || 3.3 ||style=|8.0 || 1.67 || .00 ||style=|21.3
|- align="center" bgcolor=""
| 
|style=|6 || 2 || 18.7 || .581 || .000 || .390 || 5.2 || .00 || .67 ||style=|1.00 || 7.2
|- align="center" bgcolor=""
| 
|style=|6 || 0 || 25.7 || .420 || .455 || .780 || 3.3 || 3.8 || .33 || .00 || 14.0
|- align="center" bgcolor=""
| 
| 5 || 0 || 6.0 || style=|.818 || .000 || .730 || 1.2 || .00 || .40 || .00 || 5.2
|- align="center" bgcolor=""
| 
| 2 || 0 || 6.5 || .000 || .000 || style=|1.000 || .00 || .5 || .00 || .00 || 1.0
|}

Transactions

Overview

  Cut from the roster during training camp.

Trades

Free agents

References

Denver Nuggets seasons
Denver Nuggets
Denver Nuggets
2012–13 NBA season by team